is a children's animated streaming television series created by Akira Shigino for Netflix. The show revolves around the teenage girl Naoko, who transforms into a dinosaur when she gets angry.

The series premiered on November 22, 2019 on Netflix. Its second season was made available on March 20, 2020.

Voice cast

Episodes

Season 1 (2019)

Season 2 (2020)

Release
Dino Girl Gauko was released on November 22, 2019 on Netflix.

References

External links
 

2019 anime ONAs
Netflix children's programming
Animated television series about dinosaurs
Netflix original anime
Anime with original screenplays
Comedy anime and manga
Japanese children's animated comedy television series
Japanese-language Netflix original programming